Ravn virus (RAVV) is a close relative of Marburg virus (MARV). RAVV causes Marburg virus disease in humans and nonhuman primates, a form of viral hemorrhagic fever. RAVV is a Select agent, World Health Organization Risk Group 4 Pathogen (requiring Biosafety Level 4-equivalent containment), National Institutes of Health/National Institute of Allergy and Infectious Diseases Category A Priority Pathogen, Centers for Disease Control and Prevention Category A Bioterrorism Agent, and listed as a Biological Agent for Export Control by the Australia Group.

Use of term
Ravn virus (today abbreviated RAVV, but then considered identical to Marburg virus) was first described in 1987 and is named after a 15-year old Danish boy who fell ill and died from it. Today, the virus is classified as one of two members of the species Marburg marburgvirus, which is included into the genus Marburgvirus, family Filoviridae, order Mononegavirales. The name Ravn virus is derived from Ravn (the name of the Danish patient from whom this virus was first isolated) and the taxonomic suffix virus.

Previous designations
Ravn virus was first introduced as a new subtype of Marburg virus in 1996. In 2006, a whole-genome analysis of all marburgviruses revealed the existence of five distinct genetic lineages. The genomes of representative isolates of four of those lineages differed from each other by only 0-7.8% on the nucleotide level, whereas representatives of the fifth lineage, including the new "subtype", differed from those of the other lineages by up to 21.3%. Consequently, the fifth genetic lineage was reclassified as a virus, Ravn virus (RAVV), distinct from the virus represented by the four more closely related lineages, Marburg virus (MARV).

Virus inclusion criteria
A virus that fulfills the criteria for being a member of the species Marburg marburgvirus is a Ravn virus if it has the properties of Marburg marburgviruses and if its genome diverges from that of the prototype Marburg marburgvirus, Marburg virus variant Musoke (MARV/Mus), by ≥10% but from that of the prototype Ravn virus (variant Ravn) by <10% at the nucleotide level.

Disease

RAVV is one of two marburgviruses that causes Marburg virus disease (MVD) in humans (in the literature also often referred to as Marburg hemorrhagic fever, MHF). MVD due to RAVV infection cannot be differentiated from MVD caused by MARV by clinical observation alone, which is why the clinical presentation and pathology of infections by all marburgviruses is presented together on a separate page (see Marburg virus disease (MVD)). In the past, RAVV has caused the following MVD outbreaks:

Ecology
In 2009, the successful isolation of infectious RAVV was reported from caught healthy Egyptian rousettes (Rousettus aegyptiacus). This isolation, together with the isolation of infectious MARV, strongly suggests that Old World fruit bats are involved in the natural maintenance of marburgviruses.

References

Further reading

External links
 International Committee on Taxonomy of Viruses (ICTV)

Animal viral diseases
Arthropod-borne viral fevers and viral haemorrhagic fevers
Biological weapons
Hemorrhagic fevers
Marburgviruses
Tropical diseases
Primate diseases
Virus-related cutaneous conditions
Zoonoses
Infraspecific virus taxa
Bat virome